Valentin Rebegea (born 15 May 1971) is a Romanian wrestler. He competed at the 1992 Summer Olympics and the 1996 Summer Olympics.

References

1971 births
Living people
Romanian male sport wrestlers
Olympic wrestlers of Romania
Wrestlers at the 1992 Summer Olympics
Wrestlers at the 1996 Summer Olympics
Place of birth missing (living people)